Gerd Dörich (born February 14, 1968, in Sindelfingen) is a German professional racing cyclist.

Career wins

2004 - National Championship, Track, Madison, Elite, Germany (GER)
2004 - Stuttgart, Six Days (GER)

References

External links

1968 births
Living people
People from Sindelfingen
Sportspeople from Stuttgart (region)
German male cyclists
German track cyclists
Cyclists from Baden-Württemberg
21st-century German people